Esther Van Ginderen-Verbeeck (8 September 1931 – 30 January 2018), also known as Tante Terry (Aunt Terry), was a Belgian Flemish-speaking television presenter and businesswoman. She was best known as a host of children's TV shows, often alongside Bob Davidse, better known as Nonkel Bob (Uncle Bob).  Their best known show was Kom Toch Eens Kijken.

Life and career
She was born in Hoboken, Antwerp, Belgium. In 1954, she worked for the first Flemish TV channel NIR). As "Aunt Terry", she presented, together with Bob Davidse ("Nonkel Bob"), the children's program Kom Toch Eens Kijken (Come Take a Look), and, from 1961 for eighteen years, Klein Klein Kleutertje (Little Little Toddler). After her resignation in 1979, she became a businesswoman.

From 1989, when the first Flemish commercial TV channel VTM  was hosted children's programs for them, but also as a jury member in game shows. In 1992, she became manager of Silvy Melody.

Last years and death
On the occasion of her 75th birthday in 2006, Van Ginderen was received at the Antwerp City Hall. She was active as a presenter of fashion shows and active with performances for the elderly until her death from pneumonia at age 86 in Bonheiden.

Discography
At record company Arcade Records:
 3 Hansel and Gretel
 4 The Wolf and the Seven Kids
 5 Small Thumb
 6 Rumpelstiltskin
 7 Snow White (1968)
 8 The Booted Cat (1968)
 9 Red Riding Hood (1968)
 10 Cinderella (1968)
 13 The Little Boy of Krentekoek 
 14 The Forget-Me-Not (1969))
 15 The Three Little Piglets (1969)
 16 Sleeping Beauty (1969)
 18 The Pied Piper of Hamelin (1971)
 19 The Emperor's New Clothes (1971)
 20 Female Hollow (1971)
 21 The Abduction of Marinel (1971)
 25 The Smart Pig
 26 The Steadfast Tin Soldier
 27 The Bremen Town Musicians

International Bestseller Company
 Rag Bean 97604
 The ugly duckling 605
 The Bremen Street Musicians 606
 Alladin and the Wonderlamp 607
 The Tin Soldier 608
 The Smart Pig 609
 Table-cover-610
 Sleeping Beauty 611
 Snow White 612

The Pili's
 The Pili's 1: The snowman - The old postman
 The Pili's 2: Merlin's birthday - The weatherhouse
 The Pili's 3: The rose elephant - The swimming pool

Series "Sing and Dance with Aunt Terry
 1 Hula Thumb - Two Hands - Come a little closer - 1 2 3 4 5 6 7
 2 Ikkeltje Kramikkeltje - The A-B-C - Come out - De Klepperman
 11 Little Small Toddler - I saw two bears - Impulse - The Cow - Note here, note there

Musti
 Musti 1 (1971) (Musti home, Musti on the street)
 Musti 2 (1971) (Musti in the attic, Musti station master)
 Musti 3 (1973) (Musti and the circus, Musti in the rain)

LPs
 Aunt Terry tells, volume 1
 Aunt Terry tells, volume 2
 Aunt Terry tells, volume 3
 Aunt Terry tells, volume 4
 Aunt Terry tells, volume 5: The smart little pig - The Tin Soldier - Aladdin and the Wonderlamp
 Aunt Terry sings for all good children (songs for Sinterklaas and Christmas
 Musti by Aunt Terry volume 2 (Station master - Home - On the street - In the attic - In the rain - The circus) (1974)
 Sing and dance with Aunt Terry, Louis Neefs & de Biekens (1974?)
 Sing and dance with Aunt Terry 1, with De Karekieten from Dilsen (1975)
 Sing and dance with Aunt Terry 2, with De Meiklokjes (1975)
 Sing and dance with Aunt Terry, with De Karekieten from Dilsen (1975)
 Aunt Terry tells the Pili's (The Snowman - The Birthday of Merlin - The Pink Elephant - The Old Mailman - The Weatherhouse - The Pool)
 Aunt Terry tells (Snow White - The Forget-me-not - Little Red Riding Hood - The Pied Piper of Hamelin) (1975)
 Aunt Terry tells (Cinderella - Sleeping Beauty - The three little piggies - Vrouw Holle) (1975)
 Aunt Terry tells (Hansel and Gretel - De Gelaarsde Kat - The wolf and the seven goats - The little boy and the currant cake) (1975)
 Aunt Terry tells (The ugly duckling De Bremer street musicians - Lappenbontje) (1976)
 Aunt Terry tells (Alladin and the wonder lamp - The smart little pig - The tin soldier)
 Tante Terry tells (Snow White - Tafeltje-dek-je - Doornroosje)
 Aunt Terry sings Sinterklaas songs: the 22 most beautiful Sinterklaas songs!
 Children's songs by Aunt Terry
 Our most beautiful fairy tales (double-lp)
 The color tubes: children's musical (with children's choir Carmina from Ekeren) (1979)

References

Belgian television presenters
Belgian children's television presenters
Belgian women television presenters
Belgian television actresses
1931 births
2018 deaths
Belgian businesspeople
Deaths from pneumonia in Belgium
People from Hoboken